Mulondo, officially the Municipality of Mulondo (Maranao: Inged a Mulondo), is a 3rd class municipality in the province of Lanao del Sur, Philippines. According to the 2020 census, it has a population of 19,932 people.

Etymology
Its name is derived from the Maranao dialect, which means "People of Lake"

Geography
Formerly known as Bato Intan, it is geographically situated east from Masiu, one of the four (4) Principalities of Lanao (Pangampong A Ranao), the governing bodies of the Lanao Sultanate. Strategically located in the 1st District of Lanao del Sur where it is partially urban.

Barangays

Mulondo is politically subdivided into 26 barangays.

Climate

Demographics

Economy

References

External links
Mulondo Profile at the DTI Cities and Municipalities Competitive Index
[ Philippine Standard Geographic Code]
Philippine Census Information
Local Governance Performance Management System

Municipalities of Lanao del Sur
Populated places on Lake Lanao